The Statute of Bankrupts or An Acte againste suche persones as doo make Bankrupte, 34 & 35 Henry VIII, c. 4, was an Act passed by the Parliament of England in 1542. It was the first statute under English law dealing with bankruptcy or insolvency. It was repealed by section 1 of the Act 6 Geo.4 c.16.

The Act contained an extremely long preamble which denounced debtors acting in fraud of their creditors, directed that the bodies of the offenders and all of their assets be taken by the requisite authorities and the assets be sold to pay their creditors "a portion, rate and rate alike, according to the quantity of their debts". Thereby the first bankruptcy statute also imported into English law for the first time the pari passu principle of distribution on insolvency.

These principles would later be heavily underscored by the House of Lords in the cases of National Westminster Bank Ltd v Halesowen Presswork & Assemblies Ltd [1972] AC 785 and British Eagle International Airlines Ltd v Compagnie Nationale Air France [1975] 1 WLR 758.

Preamble
The Preamble to the 1542 Act is as follows:

See also
Bankruptcy Act

References
Roy Goode, Principles of Corporate Insolvency Law, 3rd ed., para 1-05

1542 in law
1542 in England
Bankruptcy in England and Wales
Insolvency law of the United Kingdom
Acts of the Parliament of England (1485–1603)